Michael John Dorff is a mathematician at Brigham Young University known for his work in undergraduate research, promoting careers in math, popularizing mathematics, and harmonic mappings.

Life and career

Michael Dorff received his BA in Mathematics Education from Brigham Young University in 1986. He then taught High School math at Palos Verdes High, California, and Nurnberg High, Germany from 1986–1990. He received his MS from University of New Hampshire in 1992 followed by a Ph.D. in Mathematics from University of Kentucky in 1997. He taught at University of Missouri-Rolla as an assistant professor in the Department of Math and Statistics from 1997-2000 when he was hired by Brigham Young University as an assistant professor in the Department of Mathematics. Dorff became a full professor at BYU in 2011. He was the Chair of the Department of Mathematics at BYU from 2015–2019. Dorff visited Purdue University as an assistant professor in the Spring of 2003, Uniwersytet Marii Curie-Sklodowskiej as a U.S. Fulbright Scholar in Poland from 2005–2006, and Mathematical Association of America as a mathematician in Washington D.C. in 2012.

Dorff founded the NSF-funded Center for Undergraduate Research in Mathematics CURM and directed it from 2006–2017. He co-founded and co-directed the NSF-funded PIC (Preparation of Industrial Careers) Math program with Dr. Suzanne Weekes. He has served on several international and national advisory boards including the East African Centre of Mathematical Research in Kampala Uganda, the Mathematical Association of America (MAA), and the Council of Undergraduate Research (CUR).

His research interests include geometric function theory, complex analysis, minimal surfaces, data analytics, and preparing students for non-academic careers. In 2018, He was asked to be part of a compilation of videos about beauty at BYU. For his video, he discussed his work with soap bubbles. https://www.youtube.com/watch?v=m0jxX67ghPA

He married Sarah Watts Dorff; together they had 5 daughters. They are members of the Church of Jesus Christ of Latter-day Saints. While working at BYU, Michael was invited to give a devotional on campus on April 3, 2018. https://www.youtube.com/watch?v=E0wFmKn0KO8&feature=emb_logo

Awards and honors
 2020, Council on Undergraduate Research (CUR) Fellows Award.
 2019–2020, President of the Mathematical Association of America.
 In 2015, The "Mathematics Programs that Make a Difference" from the AMS for CURM.
 2012–2015, The Lawrence K. Egbert Teaching and Learning Faculty Fellowship at Brigham Young University.
 2012, Fellow of the American Mathematical Society.
 2010, The Karl G. Maeser Excellence in Teaching Award at Brigham Young University.
 2010, The Deborah and Franklin Tepper Haimo Award for Distinguished College or University Teaching of Mathematics.

Selected publications
Books:
 M. Dorff, A. Henrich, and L. Pudwell. A Mathematician's Practical Guide to Mentoring Undergraduate Research. MAA Press: An Imprint of the American Mathematical Society, 2019.
 M. Brilleslyper, M. Dorff, J. McDougall, J. Rolf, L. Schaubroeck, R. Stankewitz, and K. Stephenson. Explorations in Complex Analysis. Math. Assoc. of America. Washington, DC, 2012.

Research Papers:
 M. Brilleslyper, J. Brooks, M. Dorff, R. Howell and L. Schaubroeck. “Zeros of a one-parameter family of harmonic trinomials,” accepted for publication in Proc. Amer. Math. Soc., 2020.
 Z. Boyd*, M. Dorff, M. Nowak, M. Romney, and M. Woloszkiewicz. “Univalency of convolutions of harmonic mappings,” Appl. Math. Comput. 234 (2014), 326–332.
 M. Dorff, M. Nowak, and M. Wołoszkiewicz. “Convolutions of harmonic convex mappings.” Complex Var. Elliptic Equ. 57 (2012), no. 5, 489–503.
 M. Dorff and M. Nowak. “Landau's Theorem for planar harmonic mappings.” Comput. Methods Funct. Theory 4 (2004), no. 1, 151–158.
 M. Dorff. “Convolutions of planar harmonic convex mappings.” Complex Var. Theory Appl. 45 (2001), 263–271.

References

Living people
20th-century American mathematicians
21st-century American mathematicians
University of New Hampshire alumni
University of Kentucky alumni
Brigham Young University faculty
Fellows of the American Mathematical Society
Missouri University of Science and Technology faculty
Year of birth missing (living people)